Eric Reed may refer to:

Eric Reed (musician) (born 1970), American jazz pianist and composer
Eric Reed (baseball) (born 1980), American outfielder
Eric Reed (soccer) (born 1983), American goalkeeper
Eric Reed (horse trainer), American horse trainer

See also
Erik Read (born 1991), Canadian World Cup alpine ski racer 
Eric Reid (born 1991), American football safety
Eric Reid (sportscaster), American play-by-play announcer since 1982